Anthony Hardy Williams (born February 28, 1957) is an American politician, former businessman, and Democratic member of the Pennsylvania State Senate, representing the 8th District since 1998. Prior to entering public service, he worked at PepsiCo as a mid-level executive and later owned a small vending company.

Life and career
Williams is the son of Hardy, a politician, and Carole, an elementary school teacher. He grew up in Philadelphia. He attended Anderson Elementary School (one block from his home, where his mother taught), Mitchell Elementary School, Conwell Middle Magnet School and Westtown School. He then earned a degree in economics from Franklin & Marshall College.

He was sworn in to represent the 191st legislative district in the Pennsylvania House of Representatives in 1989. In 1998, Williams' father, Pennsylvania State Senator Hardy Williams, retired hours before the deadline to file nominating petitions, allowing Anthony the opportunity to run unopposed for his father's 8th senatorial district seat. The younger Williams had already filed his nominating petitions to run for his House seat, so he remained on both ballots. He declined to take his House seat when he won both elections simultaneously.

Current committees and assignments
Williams is the Democratic chairman of the State Government Committee in the state Senate and is a member of the Education, Banking and Insurance, Finance, and the Environmental Resources and Energy committees, and the Life Sciences Caucus. He is also a member of the Pennsylvania Council on the Arts and chairs the Black Elected Officials of Philadelphia County, an ad hoc group encompassing federal, state and municipal politicians of color. In January 2011, following the death of Michael O'Pake, Williams was elected Democratic Whip.

Ward leader
Williams is the Ward Leader of the 3rd Ward Democratic Executive Committee. He also chairs the Philadelphia Democratic United Ward Leaders of Color, a group of ward leaders of color who represent various wards within The City and County of Philadelphia.

Gubernatorial candidacy
On February 23, 2010, Williams declared his candidacy for Governor in the 2010 election. In the May primary, he finished third out of four candidates.

References

External links
Senator Anthony H. Williams official caucus website
Pennsylvania State Senate - Anthony H. Williams official PA Senate website
Anthony Hardy Williams for Pennsylvania Governor official gubernatorial campaign website

Follow the Money - Anthony H. Williams
2006 2004 2002 2000 campaign contributions

Democratic Party Pennsylvania state senators
Democratic Party members of the Pennsylvania House of Representatives
Living people
African-American state legislators in Pennsylvania
1957 births
Politicians from Philadelphia
Westtown School alumni
Franklin & Marshall College alumni
21st-century African-American politicians
20th-century African-American people